Cassius Clay (soon Muhammad Ali) fought a boxing match with Herb Siler in Miami on December 27, 1960. Clay won the bout through a technical knockout after the referee stopped the fight in the fourth round. The fight had taken place soon after Clay had joined the 5th Street Gym.

References

Siler
1960 in boxing
December 1960 sports events in the United States
1960 in sports in Florida